The Ceylon Police Independence Medal was a decoration presented to all members of the Ceylon Police in 1948, in commemoration of the country's independence from the United Kingdom.

External links
Sri Lanka Police

Orders, decorations, and medals of Sri Lanka
Awards established in 1948